Mad House is a 2022 play by Theresa Rebeck.

Production 
Mad House had its premiere production at the Ambassadors Theatre in the West End, with an opening night on 26 June 2022, following previews from 15 June. It played a limited run to 4 September 2022. Casting for the production featured David Harbour as Michael, Bill Pullman as Daniel, Akiya Henry as Lillian, Hanako Footman as Devon, Sinead Matthews as Pam, Charlie Oscar as Skylar and Stephen Wight as Nedward.

Premise 
In rural Pennsylvania, Michael struggles to look after his dying tyranincal father, Daniel. A hospice nurse Lillian arrives, and helps the abusive Daniel and agitated Michael who had had a history of hospitalization owing to mental health issues with calm competence. However, Michael's brother Nedword and dominant sister Pam soon unexpectedly turn up, determined not to lose out on inheritance.

Cast and characters

References

2022 plays